Spathosternum prasiniferum is a species of short-horned grasshopper in the family Acrididae. It is found in Indomalaya.

Subspecies
These subspecies belong to the species Spathosternum prasiniferum:
 Spathosternum prasiniferum prasiniferum (Walker, 1871)
 Spathosternum prasiniferum sinense Uvarov, 1931
 Spathosternum prasiniferum xizangensis Yin, 1982
 Spathosternum prasiniferum yunnanense Wei & Zheng, 2005

References

External links

 

Acrididae